Gorokhovetsky Uyezd (Александровский уезд) was one of the subdivisions of the Vladimir Governorate of the Russian Empire. It was situated in the northeastern part of the governorate. Its administrative centre was Gorokhovets.

Demographics
At the time of the Russian Empire Census of 1897, Gorokhovetsky Uyezd had a population of 92,240. Of these, 99.9% spoke Russian and 0.1% Belarusian as their native language.

References

 
Uezds of Vladimir Governorate
Vladimir Governorate